Ognjen Mijailović (born 30 January 2003) is a Serbian footballer who currently plays as a midfielder for FK Rad.

Career statistics

Club

Notes

References

2003 births
Living people
Serbian footballers
Association football midfielders
Serbian SuperLiga players
FK Mačva Šabac players